William John Lucas FRES (1858-1932) was a British entomologist.

Lucas was educated at a grammar school in Oxford and went to the University of London. He became a teacher at Tiffin Boys School in Kingston upon Thames and he was appointed lecturer in nature study to the Surrey County Council.

In 1898 Lucas was elected a fellow of the Entomological Society of London.

He was an authority on British Orthoptera, Odonata and Neuroptera. In his British Dragonflies, published in 1900, he described 39 British species. The book contained coloured plates. "For many years this was the only book available" for students of British dragonflies.

In 1901 Lucas joined the editorial panel of The Entomologist.

He was a member of the council of the Entomological Society from 1904 to 1906, he was president of the South London Entomological Society and vice-president of the Lancashire and Cheshire Entomological Society.

Lucas not only published important works, with plates, painted by himself, "he was also a great teacher, and stimulated younger workers unstintingly."

Bibliography 
Among the publications of William John Lucas are:

Footnotes

Sources 
  (with an image of Lucas at p. 4)
 

English entomologists
Fellows of the Royal Entomological Society
1858 births
1932 deaths
19th-century British zoologists
20th-century British zoologists